is a railway station located in the western part of the town of Hiranai in Aomori Prefecture, Japan. The station has been operating since 1939. Since 2010, the station has been operated by the Aoimori Railway Company, a third sector, regional rail operator. It is the third busiest railway station in Hiranai. Passenger trains serve the station just under 17 hours a day; the departure time between trains is roughly 30 minutes during the morning peak with reduced frequency at other times.

Location
Nishi-Hiranai Station is located at the northern terminus of Aomori Prefecture Route 206, a  road that provides access to the station from Japan National Route 4 in the west side of Hiranai. The station is situated between two populated areas located in the western side of Hiranai. The station is 98.3 kilometers from the terminus of the Aoimori Railway Line at Metoki Station. The stations adjacent to Nishi-Hiranai Station along the Aoimori Railway Line are Kominato Station and Asamushi-Onsen Station.

Station layout
Nishi-Hiranai Station has two unnumbered opposed side platforms, connected the station building by a footbridge. The station is unattended.

Platforms

History
Nishi-Hiranai Station was opened on 1 October 1939 as a station on the Tōhoku Main Line of the Japanese Government Railways (JGR), the pre-war predecessor to the Japan National Railways (JNR). The station was installed to provide access to a nearby sanatorium for disabled veterans. Regularly scheduled freight services were discontinued in November 1961. The concrete elevated footbridge at the station was installed on 1 January 1969. The station has been unattended since August 1970. With the privatization of the JNR on 1 April 1987, it came under the operational control of East Japan Railway Company (JR East). The section of the Tōhoku Main Line including this station was transferred to Aoimori Railway on 4 December 2010.

Services

The station is only served by trains operating on a local services between Aomori and Hachinohe operated by the Aoimori Railway. Passenger trains serve Nishi-Hiranai Station just under 17 hours a day from 6:38am to 11:25pm. At peak hours between the first train and 9:10am trains depart from the station roughly every 30 minutes; otherwise trains depart at an approximate hourly basis. In 2018, a daily average of 142 passengers boarded trains at Nishi-Hiranai Station, an increase from the daily average of 109 passengers the station served in 2011. In 2018 the station was the seventeenth busiest on the Aoimori Railway Line, excluding Aomori and Hachinohe stations, and the third busiest along the rail line in Hiranai.

Bus services
Nishi-Hiranai Station also functions as a bus station, with three municipal bus lines stopping at the station.  operates the bus routes that stop at the station, traveling to points within Hiranai including Moura, Inaoi, Hiranai Town Hall, Shimizugawa, and Karibasawa, as well as providing a connection to the Aomori City Bus at Asamushi Onsen.

See also
List of railway stations in Japan

References

External links

 

Railway stations in Aomori Prefecture
Aoimori Railway Line
Hiranai, Aomori
Railway stations in Japan opened in 1939